Pantex is the primary United States nuclear weapons assembly and disassembly facility that aims to maintain the safety, security and reliability of the U.S. nuclear weapons stockpile. The plant is managed and operated for the United States Department of Energy (DOE) by CNS LLC and Sandia. Consolidated Nuclear Security, LLC (CNS) is composed of member companies Bechtel National, Inc., Leidos, Inc., Orbital ATK, Inc, and SOC LLC, with Booz Allen Hamilton, Inc. as a teaming subcontractor. CNS also operates the Y-12 National Security Complex.

As a major national security site, the plant and its grounds are strictly controlled, and the airspace above and around the plant is prohibited to civilian air traffic by the FAA as Prohibited Area P-47.

History

The Pantex plant was originally constructed as a conventional bomb plant for the United States Army Air Force during the early days of World War II. The Pantex Ordnance Plant was authorized February 24, 1942. Construction was completed on November 15, 1942 and workers from all over the U.S. flocked to Amarillo for jobs.

Pantex was abruptly deactivated when the war ended and remained vacant until 1949, when Texas Technological College in Lubbock (now Texas Tech University) purchased the site for $1. Texas Tech used the land for experimental cattle-feeding operations.

In 1951, at the request of the Atomic Energy Commission (now the National Nuclear Security Administration (NNSA)), the Army exercised a recapture clause in the sale contract and reclaimed the main plant and 10,000 acres (40 km2) of surrounding land for use as a nuclear weapons production facility. The Atomic Energy Commission refurbished and expanded the plant at a cost of $25 million. The remaining 6,000 acres (24 km2) of the original site were leased from Texas Tech in 1989.

Pantex was operated by Procter & Gamble from 1951 to 1956, Mason & Hanger from 1956 to 2001, and Babcock & Wilcox from 2001 to 2014.

In 2010, the plant employed about 3,600 people and had a budget of $600 million.

Environmental concerns

 In 1998, the Agency for Toxic Substances and Disease Registry documented a statistically significant incidence of increased cancer rates and low birth weights in some of the counties surrounding Pantex, but the counties closest to the plant (Armstrong and Carson) had no significant increase in cancer rates.  The agency concluded that the plant was not likely to be associated with these findings. An earlier NIOSH study, updated in 1995, showed an elevated risk of cancer among Pantex workers.
 In 1994, the plant was listed as a Superfund site. The US Environmental Protection Agency determined that groundwater contamination was not under control. Cleanup construction was completed in 2010, and EPA currently lists the site concerns as "under control."

Controversy
 In 1986 activists from the Red River Peace Network purchased  adjacent to Pantex to create the "Peace Farm", described as "a visible witness against weapons of mass destruction." Its staff and board organized events, rallies, and gatherings opposing nuclear weapons through the 1990s and now organizes events related to the environment, nuclear proliferation and waste disposal, and peace issues.
 In the early 1980s, local Catholic Bishop Leroy Matthiesen tried persuading Catholic workers at the plant to leave their jobs, offering financial support to those who would do so.

Labor troubles
Labor troubles arose in 2007 following the implementation of stricter physical and performance requirements for armed security personnel following the September 11th attacks. The worker's union for the Pantex guards protested that the new standards were unfairly strenuous to middle-aged personnel nearing retirement. In protest 500 guards walked off the job and went on strike in April 2007 and were replaced with a temporary guard force. The strike ended with a negotiated settlement after 34 days. Guards also went on strike in a pay dispute in 1981, and unionized production and maintenance workers struck in 1970 and 2015.

Safety incidents
 In 1977, three men were killed in an explosion while machining LX-09, a plastic explosive.
 In 2005, the Project on Government Oversight claimed that Pantex workers could have caused a nuclear explosion when they improperly applied too much pressure on an obsolete W56 warhead while dismantling it. POGO said unidentified experts knowledgeable about the event told it of the danger. The U.S. Department of Energy fined the contractor running the plant at the time, BWXT, $110,000 for incidents involving the bomb, but did not mention any possibility of an explosion or identify the warhead.

Footnotes

External links

 
 
 Annotated bibliography for Pantex from the Alsos Digital Library for Nuclear Issues
 Pantex links at Nuclearpathways.org

Buildings and structures in Carson County, Texas
Economy of Amarillo, Texas
Nuclear weapons infrastructure of the United States
Superfund sites in Texas
United States Department of Energy